Maria Cuffaro (born 18 August 1964 in Rome) is an Italian journalist and host of TG3. She discovered a passion for journalism collaborating with il Manifesto, L'Espresso, Events and Chanel 4. She has been listed in the Register of Professional Journalists since 29 October 1992.

Biography

Born to an Italian father from Sicily and Indian-Swiss mother, from 15 to 22 years old she painted and tried to launch her career as a painter with two personal exhibitions: At 16 years old she held her first exhibition of drawings at the gallery "il Torchio" in Rome (1980). At 20 years old she held the second and final exhibition in Athens (1986). She worked for the art magazine Leader which, however, ceased publication after a few numbers. From 1985 to 1986 Cuffaro was a teacher of English at two elementary schools in Rome. She then worked with il Manifesto, for whom she was sent to India, Pakistan and South Africa.
In 1986 she became a radio broadcaster at Italia Radio, and also writes for Sette, Il Venerdì di Repubblica, Annabella, Avvenimenti (for this newspaper she has also edited a book on immigration), Die Tageszeitung, Nordreihnishcer Rundfunk (German radio) and Nuova Ecologia.

In 1989 Cuffaro headed the program 'Il filo d'Arianna' on Rai 3, which deals with inquiries from abroad. In the following year Sandro Curzi convinced her to join TG3. For a period she presented the program, and worked with Michele Santoro in broadcasting Il rosso e il nero, Il raggio verde and Tempo reale (1996). An investigative journalist, she has been to war zones and has produced numerous reports from Asia, Africa and South America.

In 1997 she wrote a series of documentaries for RAI 2 called Special 24hrs. In 1999 she wrote numerous documentaries for transmission on 'C'era una volta' for RAI3. In 2000 she returned to work with Michele Santoro on the documentaries Sciuscià. She participated in the 2000 edition of the World Social Forum.

Since June 2006 she has been a regular guest on the entertainment program Matinee on Rai2 and led by Max Giusti and Sabrina Nobile. In 2011, during a service of the TG3 in Tunis, she was attacked with her cameraman Claudio Rubino, but still managed to return to the hotel without serious injury.

In 2012, by now a journalist at TG3 she published her autobiography Kajal. Le vite degli altri e la mia, published by Imprimatur.

In 2013 she opened the twelfth edition of Sabato del Villaggio, in the elegant surroundings of the Theater Umberto di Lamezia Terme.

Currently she is the host of TG3 Rai.

Awards

In 2005 she won the XI Edition of the award "Ilaria Alpi" for her report "Under the Bombs in Nasiriyah" concerning the siege of the Coalition Provisional Authority in Nasiriyah.
In 2007 she won the journalism award 'Maria Grazia Cutuli' for the report from Nasiriyah with the Russian journalist Yulia Latynina.

Notes

1964 births
Living people
Italian war correspondents
Italian radio journalists
Italian television journalists
Writers from Rome